The White Trap is a 1959 British second feature thriller film directed by Sidney Hayers and starring Lee Patterson. The screenplay is by playwright Peter Barnes, who went on to write the cult stage and film comedy The Ruling Class (1972); and the Oscar nominated screenplay for Enchanted April (1991).

Plot
Escaped convict Paul Langley tries to reach his wife who is about to have a baby.

Cast
Lee Patterson as Paul Langley
Conrad Phillips as Sgt. Morrison
Michael Goodliffe as Inspector Walters
Yvette Wyatt as Ann Fisher
Felicity Young as Joan Langley
Trevor Maskell as Dr. Lucas
Harold Siddons as Maitland
Charles Leno as Padre
Ian Colin as Governor	
Helen Towers as Hilda Maxwell
Jack Allen as Dr. Hayden	
Gillian Vaughan as Wendy
John Abineri as Bernie, a Photographer (uncredited)

Critical reception
TV Guide wrote "The suspense builds up towards the end, but the plot is unrelentingly downbeat" whereas Classic Movie Ramblings called it "a very well-crafted thriller...really an excellent little movie"; and Noirish noted "one of those unexpected gems that occasionally bring joy to the B-feature watcher’s heart."

Home media release
The film is available as a Special Feature on Edgar Wallace Mysteries volume 2, released by Network DVD in 2012.

References

External links
White Trap at IMDb
The White Trap at BFI

British crime films
British thriller films
British black-and-white films
Films directed by Sidney Hayers
1950s English-language films
1950s British films